Guarding Tess is a 1994 American comedy-drama film starring Shirley MacLaine and Nicolas Cage, directed by Hugh Wilson. MacLaine plays a fictional former First Lady protected by an entourage of Secret Service agents led by one she continually exasperates (Cage).

The film is set in Somersville, Ohio (in reality Parkton, Maryland) and was nominated for a Golden Globe award in 1995 (Best Performance by an Actress in a Motion Picture – Comedy/Musical: Shirley MacLaine).

Plot
Doug Chesnic is a Secret Service agent who takes great pride in his job, performing his duties with the utmost professionalism. His assignment for the last three years has been a severe test of his patience. Doug is in charge of a team stationed in Ohio to protect Tess Carlisle, the widow of a former U.S. President.

Tess is well known for her diplomatic and philanthropic work, but seems to regard Doug less as a security officer and more as a domestic servant—not unlike her chauffeur, Earl, or her nurse, Frederick.

Doug's assignment with Tess comes to an end, so he is eager to be given a more exciting and challenging assignment. Tess decides that she wants him to stay, and Doug's assignment is extended.

Doug regards it as beneath his professional dignity to perform little chores around the house or bring Tess her breakfast in bed. Tess orders him to do so, even to fetch her ball during a round of golf. When Doug defies her, Tess contacts a close friend—the current President of the United States—to express her displeasure. The annoyed President—under the impression Doug is substandard—chastises him by phone.

The bickering between Doug and Tess continues, even in the car. While alone with Earl, Tess orders him to drive off, stranding her bodyguards. A humiliated Doug must phone the local sheriff—not for the first time—to be on the lookout for her. He fires Earl when they return, but Tess countermands that decision.

After returning from a hospital checkup, Tess watches old television footage of her husband's funeral, concentrating on a momentary glimpse of Doug among the mourners, overcome with grief. She makes an effort to get on his good side, sharing a drink and a late-night conversation. She explains that she is not close to her children, in part due to the awkward upbringing they had as a political family. Morale for the agents improves when Tess tells them that the President will be visiting her late husband's presidential library, but his subsequent cancellation lowers her spirits.

During a day out, Tess and Earl take off again without Doug on another apparent joy ride. When they don't return that night, Doug and his security detail realize Tess was likely kidnapped and contact the FBI. The FBI's investigation reveals Tess' recent dizzy spells were caused by an inoperable brain tumor (which she had indirectly told Doug about) and eventually, the car is found with an unconscious Earl but no Tess. Earl is found with small crescent-shaped burns on the back of his neck which Doug soon suspects was caused by Tess, fighting back with the car's cigarette lighter.

In Earl's hospital room, Doug and FBI agent Schaeffer question the chauffeur. He gets nervous and defensive when he sees Doug holding the lighter and attempts to frame him for the kidnapping. Furious, Doug threatens to shoot off the chauffeur's toes, one by one, until he confesses to them where Tess is being held, even going so far as to shoot one toe. Earl admits that Tess is being held captive by his sister and her husband.

The FBI and Secret Service raid the kidnappers' home and arrest them. When they find Tess buried, but alive, beneath the floor of the farm's barn, Doug and his agents volunteer to do the digging. Tess then insists that her Secret Service detail accompany her to the hospital.

Upon being released from the hospital, Tess refuses to obey the hospital rule that patients must be discharged in a wheelchair. Doug tells her, using her first name for the first time, "Tess, get in the God damn chair." After a brief pause, Tess complies, pats Doug's hand and says, "Very good, Douglas. You're going to be all right."

Cast
 Shirley MacLaine as First Lady Tess Carlisle
 Nicolas Cage as Secret Service Agent Doug Chesnic
 Austin Pendleton as Earl Fowler
 Edward Albert as Barry Carlisle
 James Rebhorn as FBI Agent Howard Schaeffer
 Richard Griffiths as Frederick
 John Roselius as Secret Service Agent Tom Bahlor
 David Graf as Secret Service Agent Lee Danielson
 Don Yesso as Secret Service Agent Ralph Buoncristiani
 James Lally as Secret Service Agent Joe Spector
 Brant von Hoffman as Secret Service Agent Bob Hutcherson
 Harry J. Lennix as Secret Service Agent Kenny Young
 Susan Blommaert as Kimberly Cannon
 Dale Dye as CIA Agent Charles Ivy
 James Handy as Secret Service Director Neal Carlo
 Hugh Wilson as The President (voice)

Reception
Guarding Tess received mixed reviews from critics. Rotten Tomatoes gives the film a 56% rating based on 34 reviews. The Washington Post described it as derivative of other recent films Driving Miss Daisy (1989), The Bodyguard (1992), and In the Line of Fire (1993), and decries "the melodramatic turnaround that sabotages the last section of the movie", but describes "the comic tension between MacLaine and Cage" as being "so well done, it doesn't matter how dumb things get".

The film grossed $27 million in the United States and Canada but only $3.8 million internationally for a worldwide total of $30.8 million.

References

External links

 
 
 

1994 films
1994 comedy-drama films
1990s English-language films
American comedy-drama films
TriStar Pictures films
Films about the United States Secret Service
Films directed by Hugh Wilson
Films scored by Michael Convertino
Films shot in Ohio
Films set in Ohio
Films shot in Baltimore
Films with screenplays by PJ Torokvei
Films with screenplays by Hugh Wilson
1990s American films